Chung Wan-mei is a Taiwanese politician. He was the Minister of the Hakka Affairs Council from 1 February 2016 until 20 May 2016.

Education
Chung is a Hakka born in Miaoli County. He obtained his bachelor's degree from the Department of Educational Psychology and Counselling of National Taiwan Normal University.

Political career
Chung became a Department Director of the Council for Hakka Affairs (CHA) in 2001. In 2008, he became the Administrative Deputy Minister of the CHA. He continued to serve the council through its renaming to the Hakka Affairs Council (HAC) on 1 January 2012. On 30 July 2014 he became the Political Deputy Minister of the HAC and became the Minister on 1 February 2016, serving until 20 May 2016.

References

1949 births
Government ministers of Taiwan
Living people
Taiwanese politicians of Hakka descent
Politicians of the Republic of China on Taiwan from Miaoli County